A list of notable bands and artists who emerged during the new wave of American heavy metal era of music in the early to mid-1990s:

List of key artists

0–9
 10 Years
 100 Demons
 108
 21 Guns
 25 ta Life
 36 Crazyfists
 40 Below Summer
 7 Angels 7 Plagues

A
 Abigail Williams
 The Absence
 The Acacia Strain
 Acid Bath
 The Accüsed
 A Day to Remember
 Adema
 A Dozen Furies
 AFI
 Age of Ruin
 Agnostic Front
 The Agony Scene
 Aiden
 A Life Once Lost
 All Out War
 All Shall Perish
 Allegiance
 All That Remains
 The Alter Boys
 Amen
 American Head Charge
 American Me (band)
 Andrew W.K.
 Animosity
 Aphasia
 Armor for Sleep
 As Cities Burn
 Asesino
 As I Lay Dying
 At All Cost
 A Static Lullaby
 At the Drive-In
 Atreyu
 August Burns Red
 The Autumn Offering
 Avenged Sevenfold

B
 Bad Acid Trip
 Bane
 The Banner
 Bayside
 Becoming the Archetype
 Behold... The Arctopus
 Benümb
 Between the Buried and Me
 Biohazard
 The Black Dahlia Murder
 Black Label Society
 Blacklisted
 Black Veil Brides
 The Blamed
 Bleed the Sky
 Bleeding Through
 The Bled
 The Blood Brothers
 Bloodlined Calligraphy
 Blood Has Been Shed
 BlöödHag
 Bloodsimple
 Botch
 Boysetsfire
 Breadwinner
 Breakdown
 Buried Inside
 Burn Season
 Burnt by the Sun
 Bury Your Dead
 Buzzoven
 Byzantine

C
 Calico System
 Candiria
 Cannae
 Casey Chaos
 Carnifex
 Cave In
 Cavity
 Champion
 The Chariot
 Chimaira
 Coal Chamber
 Coalesce
 Coheed and Cambria
 Cold
 Comeback Kid
 Common Dead
 Converge
 Coq Roq
 Corrosion of Conformity
 Cro-Mags
 Crowbar
 Crumbsuckers
 Cursed
 Cursive

D
 Damageplan
 Darkest Hour
 Deftones
 Demon Hunter
 DevilDriver
 The Devil Wears Prada
 The Dillinger Escape Plan
 Disturbed
 Down
 D.R.I.
 The Dream Is Dead
 Drowning Pool
 Dry Kill Logic

E
 Eighteen Visions
 The End
 The Esoteric
 Every Time I Die

F
Fear Factory
Five Finger Death Punch
Five Foot Thick

G
 Give Up the Ghost
 God Forbid
 Godsmack

H
 Haste the Day
 Hatebreed
 The Human Abstract

I
 Ill Niño

J
 The Juliana Theory
 The Junior Varsity

K
 Korn
 Killswitch Engage

L
 Lamb of God

M
 Machine Head
 Mahavatar
 Marilyn Manson
 Martyr A.D.
 Mastodon
 Misery Signals
 Most Precious Blood
 Mudvayne
 Mushroomhead

N
 Nine Inch Nails
 Norma Jean

O
 Overcast
 Of Mice & Men

P
 Pantera
 Poison the Well

R
 The Red Chord
 The Red Death

S
Sevendust
 Shadows Fall
 Skinlab
 Soulfly
 Slipknot
 Spineshank
 Static-X
 Still Remains
 Stone Sour
 Suicide Silence
 Superjoint
 System of a Down

T
 T.S.O.L.
 Tenet
 Terror
 These Arms Are Snakes
 Theory of a Deadman
 Thousand Foot Krutch
 Thine Eyes Bleed
 This Is Hell
 Thrice
 Through the Eyes of the Dead
 Throwdown
 Thursday
 Training for Utopia
 Trivium
 Twelve Tribes
 Twisted Method

U
 Underoath
 Unearth

V
 Vision of Disorder

W
 Walls of Jericho
 Will Haven
 With Passion
 White Zombie

Y
 Yakuza
 Year of Desolation
 Youth of Today

Z
 Zao
 Zeke
 Zero Down
 Zimmers Hole

See also
New wave of British heavy metal

References